Shadow Play Scherzo is an orchestral composition by the American composer Elliot Goldenthal.  The work was commissioned in 1988 by ASCAP in honour of Leonard Bernstein's 70th birthday and was composed in 1990.  It was first performed by the Brooklyn Philharmonic on May 24, 1988, at The Town Hall, New York City.

References

Compositions by Elliot Goldenthal
1988 compositions
Compositions for symphony orchestra
Commissioned music